Långhalsen is a lake predominantly in Nyköping Municipality, Södermanland, Sweden that is part of the Nyköpingsån drainage area. There is a very small portion of the lake's northern inlet that is part of Flen Municipality. There are three nearby lakes directly connected to its north that also are named Långhalsen due to their similar shapes, although they are considered separate lakes due to being connected by narrow rivers and straits.

References

Lakes of Södermanland County